Solute carrier organic anion transporter family member 3A1 is a protein that in humans is encoded by the SLCO3A1 gene.

See also

References

Further reading

Solute carrier family